Olimpiiska is a station on the Kyiv Metro's Obolonsko–Teremkivska Line. It was opened on 19 December 1981, and was originally named after Kyiv's Republican Stadium as Respublikansky Stadion. It was designed by A.S. Krushynskyi, T.A. Tselikovska, A.S. Andriienko, and Y.M. Sharanevych.

The station is built deep underground and consists of a central hall with arcades leading toward the station platforms. The walls have been covered with grey marble and the lighting comes from chandeliers. On a wall at the end of the central hall, are the Olympic rings, commemorating the 1980 Summer Olympics. The station is accessible by passenger tunnels on the Velyka Vasylkivska and another street.

External links
 Olimpiiska – One of Kyiv’s most intriguing metro stations — Station description and photographs 
 Kyivsky Metropoliten — Station description and photographs 
 Metropoliten.kiev.ua — Station description and photographs 

Kyiv Metro stations
Railway stations opened in 1981
1981 establishments in Ukraine